The 1960 Montana State Bobcats football team was an American football team that represented Montana State College (now known as Montana State University) as an independent during the 1960 NCAA College Division football season. In its third season under head coach Herb Agocs, the team compiled a 5–3–1 record.

Schedule

References

Montana State
Montana State Bobcats football seasons
Montana State Bobcats football